The Cora was a digital fire-control system designed by Hungarian-Swiss Peter Tóth and produced by the Swiss company Contraves.

Development 
Peter Tóth started the design of Cora-1 in 1957. The system was intended for anti-aircraft fire direction with the Swiss Army. However, Cora-1 turned out to be too slow and too bulky for this application. It was programmed for other applications by programmers including Heinz Lienhard. One copy of the system was used at the École Polytechnique Fédérale de Lausanne (EPFL) for cartography, and was put on display during Expo 64. The unit was rediscovered in storage in 2011, and is now on display at the Musée Bolo, in the Computer Science department of the EPFL. Cora-1-was one of the first fully transistorized digital computers built in Switzerland according to the Von Neumann architecture.

An improved version of this computer was developed subsequently by a team led by Swiss engineer Peter Blum. Cora-2 was successfully used for anti-aircraft fire direction being compact enough to fit into the corresponding mobile control unit.  

The Musée Bolo met with Peter Tóth and released several videos around his work on the Cora.

References

External links 

 Discovery of Two Historical Computers in Switzerland: Zuse Machine M9 and Contraves Cora and Discovery of Unknown Documents on the Early History of Computing at the ETH Archives, Making the History of Computing Relevant , Springer 2013
 Schweizer Transistorrechner für militärische und zivile Zwecke,  IT Magazine 2012/01

Military computers
Artillery components
Artillery operation
Applications of control engineering
Ballistics
Military electronics
Computer-related introductions in 1978